Dotfuscator is a tool performing a combination of code obfuscation, optimization, shrinking, and hardening on .NET, Xamarin and Universal Windows Platform apps. Ordinarily, .NET executables can easily be reverse engineered by free tools (such as ILSpy, dotPeek and JustDecompile), potentially exposing algorithms and intellectual property (trade secrets), licensing and security mechanisms. Also, code can be run through a debugger and its data inspected. Dotfuscator can make all of these things more difficult.

Dotfuscator was developed by PreEmptive Solutions. A free version of the .NET Obfuscator, called the Dotfuscator Community Edition, is distributed as part of Microsoft's Visual Studio.  However, the current version is free for personal, non-commercial use only.

References

Further reading
"Why and how to use Obfuscation for .NET with Dotfuscator". Microsoft Visual Studio 2017 Documentation
"Obfuscation and .NET". The Journal of Object Technology. Vol. 4, No. 4, May–June 2005. pp. 79–83. 
 MSDN Magazine. Miller Freeman. pp. 11–12. 
Reversing: Secrets of Reverse Engineering. John Wiley & Sons.
 "Review: PreEmptive Way To Obfuscate .Net Apps". CRN Magazine
 Windows Developer Power Tools. O'Reilly Media.
 "Dotfuscator expands its functionality". InfoWorld.
 Visual Basic 2008 For Dummies. John Wiley & Sons.
 Professional Visual Studio 2010. John Wiley & Sons.

External links 
 https://news.microsoft.com/2004/07/19/preemptive-solutions-dotfuscator-will-ship-with-microsoft-visual-studio-2005/
 https://msdn.microsoft.com/library/dd551417.aspx
 http://www.dirkstrauss.com/visual-studio-2012-tips-part-5-protect-your-code-obfuscate/
 http://www.drdobbs.com/windows/enhanced-dotfuscator-ce-for-visual-stud/199901475
 https://web.archive.org/web/20110201004909/http://www.clevelandpress.com/dotfuscator2.htm

Software obfuscation
.NET programming_tools
Microsoft Visual Studio extensions